Metaleptus is a genus of beetles in the family Cerambycidae, containing the following species:

 Metaleptus angulatus (Chevrolat, 1834)
 Metaleptus batesi Horn, 1885
 Metaleptus brasiliensis (Schaufuss, 1871)
 Metaleptus hondurae Nonfried, 1894
 Metaleptus lecontei (Casey, 1912)
 Metaleptus pyrrhulus Bates, 1880

References

Trachyderini
Cerambycidae genera